Nicolas Roope (born 26 February 1972 in Singapore, Singapore) is a British industrial and digital media designer and entrepreneur.

Education and career 
Roope received Bachelor's degree in Fine Arts, Sculpture from Liverpool John Moores University. Roope's career combines his interest in art, design, sustainability and technology into various commercial and artistic pursuits. His designs have been included in MoMA, Cooper-Hewitt collection and The V&A. He is the co-founder of GGGGGGGGG,Antirom, Poke,Hulger, Plumen, The Lovie Awards, Internet Week Europe and a member of IADAS, the Superbrands Council, and MUBI, Clubzero, Given and Diva Advisory Boards.

Awards and honors
 Winner of 10 Webby Awards
 Winner of D&AD Black Pencil
 Included in The Wired 100
 Included in The Adage Creative 50
 Plumen 001, designed by Samuel Wilkinson and Hulger (Nicolas is creative director of Hulger), has been included in MOMA permanent collection
 Included in The Tech City Insider 100
 Winner of Brit Insurance Design Awards
 In the inaugural list of the British Interactive Media Association Hall Of Fame 20
 Awarded the London Design Festival's "Design Entrepreneur Medal" in 2014.

References

1972 births
British designers
British businesspeople
Living people